Central Group consists of a variety of diverse investments in various corporations in Thailand and abroad, including investments in retail, property development, brand management, hospitality, and food and beverage sectors, and in digital lifestyle.

History 

Founder Tiang emigrated from Hainan Island to Bangkok in 1925. Most other Chinese immigrants started businesses in Chinatown, Bangkok.  He set up his first shop in the Thon Buri district on the outskirts of Bangkok across the Chao Phraya River from the city center.  He moved across the Chao Phraya River to a location near the grand Oriental Hotel (now the Mandarin Oriental), where he opened a store with his eldest son, Samrit, in 1947. In 1956, the family opened Thailand's first department store in Chinatown. In 1957, Tiang's son, Samrit Chirathivat, opened the first Central Department Store in Wangburapha, Phra Nakhon, Bangkok. The company's property development arm, Central Pattana was founded in 1980, and opened its first shopping centre, CentralPlaza Ladprao in Chatuchak District, Bangkok, in 1982. Besides expansion through physical presence in the Bangkok retail space, Central Group has in recent years built an online presence among ASEAN e-tailers.

Key business line

Malls and commercial properties

Retail and brands

Hospitality 
Central Group owns and manages visitor accommodation at all major Thai tourist destinations and around the world under own banners as well as international brands. Hotels cover every segment from luxury to economy. Central’s own brands comprise Centara Grand, Centara, Centra and Cosi, while internationally-branded hotels include Park Hyatt Bangkok and Hilton Pattaya. In Japan, Central Group is a co-investor in Felice Hotel Group, whose brands include Hotel Hillarys, Hotel Relief, Hotel ICI, and Hotel Stork.

Central Group has also pioneered restaurant chains in Thailand, and operates well-known local, regional, and international food brands such as Mister Donut, KFC, Auntie Anne’s, Pepper Lunch, Chabuton, The Terrace, Yoshinoya, Ootoya, Tenya, Katsuya and Fezt.

Philanthropy 
Central Tham is a social development project founded by Central Group, with the objective of creating jobs and careers, helping to build and support local communities, and improving the quality of life for employees and the community in a sustainable manner.
 Thailand
In 2020, Central Group donated 68 million USD to help Thai people during COVID-19 pandemic.
Vietnam
In 2017, Central Group presented gifts to 3,600 disadvantaged children.
In 2020, Central Group donated 70,000 medical masks and 9,000 anti-drop glasses to two leading hospitals in Hanoi and Ho Chi Minh City, National Hospital of Tropical Diseases Hanoi and National Hospital of Tropical Diseases Ho Chi Minh. Central Group presented 4 medical rooms for negative pressure isolation treatment, isolation support, and treatment of COVID-19 patients.

See also 
 Big C
 Chirathivat family
 Lotus's
 Robinson Department Store
 Thai Chinese

References

External links 
 Central Group official website

 
Retail companies of Thailand
Real estate companies of Thailand
Hospitality companies of Thailand
Companies based in Bangkok
Conglomerate companies established in 1947
1947 establishments in Thailand
Hospitality companies established in 1947
Retail companies established in 1947